The following is a list of Malayalam films released in 1961.

1961
Malayalam
 Mal
 1961
1961 in Indian cinema